Võpolsova is a village in Setomaa Parish, Võru County in southeastern Estonia.

Setu folk singer Anne Vabarna (1877–1964) was born in Võpolsova village.

References

 

Villages in Võru County